Scybalista is a genus of moths of the family Crambidae.

Species
Scybalista byzesalis (Walker, 1859)
Scybalista restionalis Lederer, 1863

References

Natural History Museum Lepidoptera genus database

Glaphyriinae
Crambidae genera
Taxa named by Julius Lederer